The Golden Touch of Frankie Carle was a short-lived musical variety television series broadcast in the United States by NBC from August to October 1956.

The Golden Touch of Frankie Carle featured the pianist and guest singers performing a variety of music, including popular standards and the current hits of the day.

The program's main purpose was to round out the half-hour prior to the beginning of prime time following the conclusion of the network's evening news broadcasts, which were, like most network news broadcasts of the era, then only 15 minutes long.

In August and October the program was aired only on Monday nights, but during September was shown on Tuesday night as well.

References
Brooks, Tim and Marsh, Earle, The Complete Directory to Prime Time Network and Cable TV Shows

NBC original programming
1956 American television series debuts
1956 American television series endings
1950s American variety television series